Nymphicula australis is a moth in the family Crambidae. It was described by Cajetan Felder, Rudolf Felder and Alois Friedrich Rogenhofer in 1875. It is found on Fiji.

The wingspan is 14–16 mm. The base of the forewings is whitish and the basal area is fuscous mixed with orange. The antemedian band is orange, bordered by whitish. There is a dark streak above the dorsum. The base of the hindwings is fuscous with a white subbasal fascia and an orange antemedian band.

References

Nymphicula
Moths described in 1875